Taste is the seventh studio album by Montreal-based indie rock band Islands. It was released on May 13, 2016.

Track listing

References

2016 albums
Islands (band) albums